Events in the year 1965 in the Republic of India.

Incumbents
 President of India – Sarvepalli Radhakrishnan
 Prime Minister of India – Lal Bahadur Shastri
 Chief Justice of India – P. B. Gajendragadkar

Governors
 Andhra Pradesh – Pattom A. Thanu Pillai 
 Assam – Vishnu Sahay
 Bihar – M. A. S. Ayyangar 
 Gujarat – Mehdi Nawaz Jung (until 1 August), Nityanand Kanungo (starting 1 August)
 Jammu and Kashmir – Mahraja Karan Singh (starting 30 March)
 Karnataka – S. M. Shrinagesh (until 2 April), V. V. Giri (starting 2 April)
 Kerala – V. V. Giri (until 2 April), Ajith Prasad Jain (starting 2 April)
 Madhya Pradesh – Hari Vinayak Pataskar (until 10 February), K. Chengalaraya Reddy (starting 10 February)
 Maharashtra – P V Cherian 
 Nagaland – Vishnu Sahay 
 Odisha – Ajudhia Nath Khosla 
 Punjab – Hafiz Mohammad Ibrahim (until 1 September), Sardar Ujjal Singh (starting 1 September)
 Rajasthan –  Sampurnanand 
 Uttar Pradesh – Bishwanath Das 
 West Bengal – Padmaja Naidu

Events
 National income - 283,600 million
 14 January - Food Corporation of India was founded.
 26 January – Hindi becomes the official language of India.
 26 January – Anti-Hindi agitations break out in India because of which Hindi does not get "National Language" status and remains one of the 23 Official Languages of India.
 24 February – English is adopted as an associate language in dealings between the Central government and the non Hindi speaking states.
 20 March – First fighting in the Indo-Pakistani War of 1965 between West Pakistan and India only.
 29 May – 1965 Dhanbad coal mine disaster – A mining accident in Dhanbad, India kills 274.
 July 14 - Sheikh Abdullah kept at custody in Kodaikanal for two years from July 1965 - June 1967.
 5 August – War begins between India and Pakistan.
 2 September – Kashmir is declared an "Integral Part of India" and is not a "disputed territory", later responded by the Pakistani troops entering the Indian sector of Kashmir.
 6 September – Indian troops attempt to invade Lahore.
 6–22 September – A full-scale Indo-Pakistani war is fought over Kashmir, which ends after a UN Security Council calls for a ceasefire on 20 September.
 8 September – India opens two additional fronts against Pakistan.
 9 September – U.N. Secretary General U Thant negotiates with Pakistan President Ayub Khan.
 16 September – China protests against Indian provocations in its border region.
 18 September – Soviet Premier Alexei Kosygin invites the leaders of India and Pakistan to meet in the Soviet Union to negotiate.
 22 September – Radio Peking announces that Indian troops have dismantled their equipment on the Chinese side of the border.
 24 September – Fighting resumes between Indian and Pakistani troops.
 1 December – The Border Security Force is formed as a special force to guard the borders.
Femina Miss India held for the first time

Law

Births
14 March – Aamir Khan, actor and film producer.
26 March  Prakash Raj, actor and film director.
23 April – Jamling Tenzing Norgay, mountain climber.
3 June  Radha, actress.
2 July – Krishna Bhagavaan, actor.
15 August  Raghavendra Rajkumar, actor and producer.
19 August – Hemant Birje, actor
2 September – Partho Sen-Gupta, independent film director and script writer.
27 September – Sudha Chandran, dancer, actress.
11 October –  Ronit Roy, film and television actor
1 November – Padmini Kolhapure, actress.
2 November – Shahrukh Khan, actor, film producer and television host.
30 November – Tashi Tenzing, mountain climber.
25 December – Swami Ramdev, Yogguru.
27 December – Salman Khan, actor, film producer and television host.

Full date unknown
S. Joseph, poet.
Amita Kanekar, novelist.

Deaths
21 January – Geeta Bali, actress (b. 1930).
3 March – Amirbai Karnataki, actress and singer (b. c1906).

Full date unknown
Motilal, actor (b. 1910).
A.B. Purani, disciple and biographer of Sri Aurobindo (b. 1894).

See also 
 Bollywood films of 1965

References

 
India
Years of the 20th century in India